Axel Domont (born 7 August 1990) is a French winemaker and former racing cyclist, who competed professionally between 2013 and 2020, entirely for UCI WorldTeam .

Major results

2011
 2nd Piccolo Giro di Lombardia
 3rd Overall Giro del Friuli-Venezia Giulia
 8th Overall Tour des Pays de Savoie
 8th Overall Ronde de l'Isard
 9th Road race, UEC European Under-23 Road Championships
2012
 5th Overall Toscana-Terra di Ciclismo
1st Stage 5
 7th Overall Ronde de l'Isard
2014
 1st Stage 5 Circuit de la Sarthe
 Tour du Limousin
1st  Mountains classification
1st  Sprints classification
 1st  Sprints classification Route du Sud

Grand Tour general classification results timeline

References

External links

1990 births
Living people
French male cyclists
Sportspeople from Valence, Drôme
Cyclists from Auvergne-Rhône-Alpes